Fox C-6 School District is a school district headquartered in Arnold, Missouri in Greater St. Louis. The district serves northeastern Jefferson County, including suburban areas to the north and rural areas to the south. The district serves Arnold and several unincorporated areas, including portions of Barnhart and Imperial. As of 2014, the district has almost 12,000 students, while about 65,000 people total live within the district boundaries. It is the largest school district in Jefferson County.

History

The Fox Consolidated School District formed in 1948 when the Bowen, Lone Dell, Saline, Seckman, and Soulard one-room school houses consolidated. All students were consolidated into the Fox School, which is the current Fox Middle School. The district was originally a K-8 school district, with high school students having a choice of Crystal City High School and Herculaneum High School. The district became K-12 when Fox High School was established in 1955. The Antonia School District was consolidated into the Fox district in 1970.

In 2013, the district hired Kelly Nash, the daughter in law of the president of the school board, Linda Nash, as its food services director; Kelly Nash was previously an assistant manager at a McDonald's. Due to the criticism, the district enacted an anti-nepotism policy.

In May 2014, a group of parents, who had criticized school-district policies, accused district administrators of posting defamatory comments about the parents on the Topix public forum. The group of parents subpoenaed Topix to obtain the poster's IP addresses and then filed court orders with AT&T and Charter Communications to obtain the identities associated with the IP addresses. In June 2014, the parents filed a libel suit against district officials. The district revealed the names of the accused administrators, who were placed on administrative leave. Superintendent Dianne Critchlow was one of the individuals put on leave, and the district began a search for a new superintendent. The school board accepted Critchlow's resignation effective October 31, 2014, hired an interim superintendent, and fired Critchlow's husband.

Schools

High schools
 Fox High School (Arnold)
 Seckman High School (Imperial)

Middle schools
 Antonia Middle School (Unincorporated area near Barnhart)
 Fox Middle School (Arnold)
 Ridgewood Middle School (Unincorporated area near Arnold)
 Seckman Middle School (Unincorporated area, Imperial)

Elementary schools
 Antonia Elementary School (Unincorporated area near Imperial)
 Fox Elementary School (Arnold)
 George Guffey Elementary School (Unincorporated area near Fenton)
 Clyde Hamrick Elementary School (Unincorporated area near Imperial)
 Ray and Nancy Hodge Elementary School (Unincorporated area near Imperial)
 Lone Dell Elementary School (Unincorporated area near Arnold)
 Meramec Heights Elementary School (Unincorporated area near Arnold)
 Rockport Heights Elementary School (Arnold)
 Seckman Elementary School (Unincorporated area, Imperial)
 Sherwood Elementary School (Arnold)
 Richard A. Simpson Elementary School (Unincorporated area near Arnold)

Early childhood
 Don Earl Early Childhood Learning Center (Arnold)

References

External links
 

School districts in Missouri
Education in Jefferson County, Missouri
1948 establishments in Missouri
School districts established in 1948